Hasan Seyidbeyli was a Soviet and Azerbaijani writer, dramatist, screenwriter, film director, and People's Artist of the Azerbaijan SSR (23.12.1976).

Biography
Hasan Seyidbeyli was born on December 22, 1920 in Baku, the Azerbaijan SSR. In 1938-1939, he studied at Leningrad Institute of Film Directors. In 1942, his literary activity began. In 1943, he continued his education on the director faculty of the Gerasimov Institute of Cinematography (with S.Eisenstein and G.Kozintsev).

Hasan Seyidbeyli is the author of such screenplays as To my dear nation (1954), Under the sultry sky (1957), On distant shores (1958), Soviet Azerbaijan, and Perfection.

He is the author of screenplays and director of films such as Telephonist girl (1962), Why are you silent? (1962), Find the girl (1970), and Value of happiness (1976).

Hasan Seyidbeyli is the director of “Nesimi”, which was awarded the first-place prize at the VII All-Union Festival in Baku.

From 1963 to 1980, he was the chairman of Azerbaijan Union of Filmmakers. Hasan Seyidbeyli died on June 25, 1980 in Baku.

Filmography

Memory
A street in Baku is named after Hasan Seyidbeyli.

References

External links
 

1920 births
Film people from Baku
1980 deaths
Soviet film directors
Azerbaijani film directors
Soviet screenwriters
Male screenwriters
People's Artists of Azerbaijan
Soviet Azerbaijani people
20th-century screenwriters